Sheeba is a 2005 family film that was released on DVD on January 19, 2011. It was directed by Michael J. Jacobs, and stars Dylan Patton, Edward Asner, Judge Reinhold, Sarah Ryder, Stacey Springer, Kathy Patrick, and Ruby Handler. During production, the film's working title was Crab Orchard. It was known as Angel Dog 2 when released on DVD in the UK in 2013.

Story
Sheeba is the tale of a young boy named Clay Thomas (Patton) from New York City whose parents have become estranged after the events of 9-11.  His mother (Handler) elects to move them away from his firefighter father (Reinhold) to live in the country with Clay's grandfather (Asner). At first, a lonesome Clay initially struggles to fit in and make friends in the rural community, but he eventually gets into a fight with a troublemaking teenager named Wax at school and is expelled as a result. A bitter Clay is confronted by his grandfather and mother for his actions, but after learning about what had happened, Clay’s mother takes him back to school and the principal gives Clay another chance on the condition that he doesn’t start another fight in school again.

Despite a difficult start in adjusting to a new school and trying to make friends, Clay soon finds comfort and friendship with his new dog, a border collie named Sheeba. He also makes friends with two of the kids from his school, a girl named Kristen and a boy named Amir. When bitter tensions between Clay and Wax mount, Clay finds himself in some serious trouble. Wax eventually steals Sheeba and takes the dog to his father’s land, but when Clay arrives to get his dog back, they are both chased off and separated when Wax shoots Sheeba in the left hind leg with his father’s rifle.

As his parents reunite together and join forces with the rest of the community to find Clay, Clay spends the next two days in the remote countryside searching for his missing dog. He eventually finds Sheeba, wounded but alive, and the two of them seek refuge in an abandoned barn. Unbeknownst to either of them, Wax secretly follows them undetected, sets fire to the barn, and locks them up inside. Sheeba eventually escapes and runs off to find help, but Clay remains trapped inside the burning barn. Fortunately for Clay, Sheeba returns with his parents, friends, and an armed force of policemen and firefighters to rescue Clay and put out the fire. Clay watches with relief and joy as his parents decide to get back together again as a family, while he makes peace with his friends Kristen and Amir. Sheeba is hailed as a hero by the community for her bravery and undying loyalty to Clay and his family.

A few days later, the police inform Clay and his parents that Wax had just been arrested after admitting to starting the fire and trying to kill Clay and Sheeba. Wax’s father was also arrested for committing a number of unsolved crimes around the community after Wax revealed this secret information during his interview at the police station. With Wax and his father in prison and his family reunited at last, Clay is able to enjoy a comfortable life in the rural community with his family, friends, and his faithful dog Sheeba.

Cast
 Ed Asner as Grandpa Cecil
 Judge Reinhold as Jim Thomas
 Ruby Handler as Kim Thomas
 Dylan Patton as Clay Thomas
 Betsy Zajko as Debbie
 Robin Christian as Dwayne
 Cliff Ponder as Doug
 Kumars Salehi as Amir
 Sierra Peters as Kristin
 Kyle Tolliver as Wax
 James Pobiega as Wax's Dad 
 Jonathan Clodfelter as Buck
 Skye Peters as Kristin's Sister (as Skye Peters)
 Floyd Allsop as Kristin's Dad
 Bill Kephardt as Store Manager
 Ron McDaniel as Grandpa's Friend
 Greg Wolf as Doctor
 Shanah Richardson as Animal Control Officer #1
 Catherine Miller as Animal Control Officer #2
 John Simpson as Bus Driver
 Jack Houser as Truck Driver
 Doris Wenzel as Cashier
 Ed Zilewicz as Informant
 Terry Jones as Medic #1
 Michael J. Jacobs as Medic #2
 Paul Harleston as Jim's Friend
 Georgia Morgan as Mrs. Ogle
 Shawn Marmion as Fireman
 Jason Cox as Impatient Driver
 Red as Sheeba

Critical reception
In an advance review, Home Media Magazine deemed Sheeba a "heartwarming family film", and declared "if you like dog films and family dramas with a happy ending, this is one to check out."

Sheeba was also awarded the Dove Family Approved Seal by the Dove Foundation.

In another review of the film, under its UK title Angel Dog 2, Mike Jeavons of Shameful Sequels on Channel Awesome stated that Sheeba is "corny, messy, and poorly produced."

References

External links

2005 films
2010s English-language films
2000s English-language films
American comedy-drama films
2000s American films
2010s American films